Valentin Mikhaylovich Kornev  was a Soviet sport shooter who won the silver medal in the 300 m free rifle event at the 1968 Summer Olympics in Mexico City.

References

1942 births
2016 deaths
Soviet male sport shooters
Olympic shooters of the Soviet Union
Shooters at the 1968 Summer Olympics
Shooters at the 1972 Summer Olympics
Olympic silver medalists for the Soviet Union
Olympic medalists in shooting
Medalists at the 1968 Summer Olympics
Sportspeople from Yaroslavl